Harry Mutuma Kathurima (born 20 August 1952 in Meru) is a Kenyan diplomat. Kathurima was from August 2005 to September 2010 Kenyan ambassador to Germany.

Background 
Kathurima studied humanities at the University of Nairobi and graduated in 1976. In 1982 he completed a degree in Public Administration from the University of Birmingham. Kathurima was the late 1970s, working as a district officer in Malindi District, after which he worked until 1982 in the office of the provincial council in Mombasa. In 1985, was changed to the Office of the President where he worked as Assistant Secretary. Then followed a post as secretary of state from 1991 to 1997, he worked there as chief of protocol. He subsequently held positions in urban ministry and the Ministry of Co-development. In 2004 he was appointed to the Foreign Service and served as High Commissioner in New Delhi. During the two-year stay in India Kathurima was also accredited to Bangladesh, Singapore and Sri Lanka. From August 2005 to September 2010 was Kathurima Kenyan ambassador to Germany.

Kalonzo campaign 

Mutuma Kathurima was named the head of Kalonzo Musyoka's presidential campaign advisory group in January 2012 which included the current government spokesman, Muthui Kariuki and 16 other members.

Personal life 

Kathurima is married and has two children.

References 

1952 births
Living people
Kenyan diplomats
Ambassadors of Kenya to Germany
High Commissioners of Kenya to India
High Commissioners of Kenya to Singapore
High Commissioners of Kenya to Sri Lanka
High Commissioners of Kenya to Bangladesh